The Montclair Public Schools are a comprehensive community public school district that serves students in kindergarten through twelfth grade from the Township of Montclair, in Essex County,  New Jersey, United States. The district consists of seven elementary schools, three middle schools and one high school.

As of the 2020–21 school year, the district, comprised of 11 schools, had an enrollment of 6,441 students and 574.3 classroom teachers (on an FTE basis), for a student–teacher ratio of 11.2:1.

The district is classified by the New Jersey Department of Education as being in District Factor Group "I", the second-highest of eight groupings. District Factor Groups organize districts statewide to allow comparison by common socioeconomic characteristics of the local districts. From lowest socioeconomic status to highest, the categories are A, B, CD, DE, FG, GH, I and J.

Each school has a magnet theme, which becomes the focus of the school's teaching style. Students have "freedom of choice" as to which school they want to attend. School selection is not dictated based on location of residence within Montclair. When registering in the district, parents rank their school preferences from highest to lowest, with preferences given for siblings of existing students and special needs. School preferences are accommodated as long as space is available.

History
In 1948 schools were racially integrated. One teacher was black.

Awards and recognition

In both the 1989-90 and 1993-94 school years, Watchung School was recognized with the National Blue Ribbon Award of Excellence from the United States Department of Education, the highest honor that an American school can achieve. Hillside School was recognized as a Blue Ribbon School for the 1987-88 school year.

The district was awarded the New Jersey Governor's Award for Performance Excellence – Silver in 2005, was commended by the United States Department of Education as one of six exemplary magnet school programs in the nation, was recognized by The Wall Street Journal for its public schools, and was certified by the New Jersey Department of Education during the 2004-05 school year.

Montclair Public Schools was cited for its magnet school program, as one of six school districts nationwide selected as the focus of Innovations in Education: Creating Successful Magnet School Programs, describing those schools whose "successful magnet programs offer a range of contexts, experiences, and perspectives".

Nishuane School was named as a "Star School" by the New Jersey Department of Education, the highest honor that a New Jersey school can achieve, in the 1993-94 school year. Watchung School was also named a Star School for 1993-94.

Schools
Schools in the district (with 2021–22 enrollment data from the National Center for Education Statistics) are:

Elementary schools
Bradford Elementary School (389 students; in grades PreK-5, Magnet Theme: The University Magnet)
Frances Aboushi, Principal
Charles H. Bullock Elementary School (434; K-5, Environmental Science)
Nami Kuwabara, Principal
Edgemont Montessori School (237; K-5, Montessori)
Briony Carr-Clemente, Principal
Hillside Elementary School (489; 3-5, Gifted and Talented)
Samantha Anglin, Principal
Nishuane Elementary School (428; PreK-2, Gifted and Talented)
Frank Sedita, Principal
Northeast Elementary School (390; K-5, Global Studies)
Terrence Sommerville, Principal
Watchung Elementary School (400; K-5, Science and Technology)
Patrick Krenn, Principal

Middle schools

Buzz Aldrin Middle School (662; 6-8, The STEM Magnet)
Major Jennings, Principal
Glenfield Middle School (665; 6-8, Visual and Performing Arts)
Dr. Lisa Rollins, Principal
Renaissance Middle School at the Rand Building (243; 6-8, Liberal Arts)
Maria Francisco Jr., Principal

High school
Montclair High School (2,034; 9-12)
Jeffrey A. Freeman, Principal

Former schools
 Grove Street Elementary School
 Southwest Elementary School
 George Inness Middle School

Administration
Core members of the district's administration are:
Dr. Jonathan C. Ponds, Superintendent of Schools
Christina Hunt, Board Secretary / School Business Administrator
Dr. Kalisha Morgan, Assistant Superintendent for Equity, Curriculum and Instruction
Dr. Felice A. Harrison-Crawford, Assistant Superintendent of Operations and School Support Services

Board of education 
The district's board of education is now comprised of nine members who set policy and oversee the fiscal and educational operation of the district through its administration. As a Type I school district until 2021, the board had had seven trustees who had been appointed by the Mayor to serve three-year terms of office on a staggered basis, with either two or three members up for reappointment each year. Of the more than 600 school districts statewide, Montclair was one of 15 districts with appointed school boards. The board appoints a superintendent to oversee the district's day-to-day operations and a business administrator to supervise the business functions of the district.

In 2009, voters rejected a referendum proposal that would have switched the district from a Type I (appointed) to a Type II (elected) board. In a 2020 referendum, after five separate times when voters supported retaining the Type I / mayoral appointment system, voters approved the switch to a Type II /  elected board by a more than two-to-one margin. The change to an elected board meant that the size of the board increased to nine seats. In a March 2022 special election, voters elected two candidates to fill those added seats that will expire in December 2023, with three seats up for election each November as part of the general election, starting in 2022.

Elementary schools gallery

Middle schools gallery

References

External links 
Montclair Public Schools

School Data for the Montclair Public Schools, National Center for Education Statistics

Montclair, New Jersey
New Jersey District Factor Group I
School districts in Essex County, New Jersey